Moses Kamut (born 7 July 1982) is a ni-Vanuatu sprinter who specializes in the 100 and 400 metres.

He competed at the 2004 Summer Olympics, the 2006 Commonwealth Games and the 2008 Summer Olympics without reaching the final. In Beijing he finished 7th in his heat with a time of 10.81 seconds.

His personal best 100 metres time is 10.64 seconds, achieved in July 2005 in Koror. His personal best 400 metres time is 47.63 seconds, achieved in March 2005 in Sydney.

Achievements

References

External links
 

1982 births
Living people
People from Tafea Province
Vanuatuan male sprinters
Athletes (track and field) at the 2004 Summer Olympics
Athletes (track and field) at the 2008 Summer Olympics
Olympic athletes of Vanuatu
Athletes (track and field) at the 2002 Commonwealth Games
Athletes (track and field) at the 2006 Commonwealth Games
Athletes (track and field) at the 2010 Commonwealth Games
Commonwealth Games competitors for Vanuatu